Droste-Preis is a literary prize awarded in Baden-Württemberg, Germany. The city of Meersburg awards the Droste Prize in memory of the writer Annette von Droste-Hülshoff, who spent the last years of her life in Meersburg. It is awarded every three years. The award is endowed with €6,000 (First Prize: €4,000). The award is given only to women.

Winners 

1957 Erika Burkart
1960 Nelly Sachs
1963 Christine Busta
1967 Rose Ausländer
1971 Hilde Domin
1975 Eva Zeller
1979 Gertrud Leutenegger
1982 Dorothee Sölle, Maria Menz
1985 Marie-Thérèse Kerschbaumer
1988 Elisabeth Plessen
1991 Jenny Aloni
1994 Eveline Hasler
1997 Friederike Mayröcker
2000 Helen Meier
2003 Kathrin Schmidt, First prize: Julia Schoch
2006 Ulrike Draesner, First prize: Marion Poschmann
2009 Marlene Streeruwitz, First prize: Silke Scheuermann
2012 Helga M. Novak, First prize: Ulrike Almut Sandig
2015 Judith Schalansky, First prize: Teresa Präauer
2018 Olga Flor, First prize: Julia Weber
2021 Katharina Hacker, First prize: Laura Freudenthaler

References

External links

Literary awards of Baden-Württemberg